KAGE may refer to:

 KAGE (AM), a radio station (1580 AM) licensed to serve Van Buren, Arkansas, United States
 KHWK (AM), a radio station (1380 AM) licensed to serve Winona, Minnesota, United States, which held the call sign KAGE from 1957 to 2019
 KGSL, a radio station (95.3 FM) licensed to serve Winona, Minnesota, which held the call sign KAGE-FM until 2015
 KAGE: Alternative Game Engine, a free and open-source game engine
 Shadow of the Ninja, a video game